Theodor Dahlberg (1 May 1884 – 13 February 1963) was a Swedish wrestler. He competed in the middleweight event at the 1912 Summer Olympics.

References

External links
 

1884 births
1963 deaths
Olympic wrestlers of Sweden
Wrestlers at the 1912 Summer Olympics
Swedish male sport wrestlers
People from Kungsbacka
Sportspeople from Halland County